"Bad Dream" is a song by Australian indie-pop band The Jungle Giants. It was released in August 2017 as the third single from the band's third studio album Quiet Ferocity. The singles was certified gold in Australia in February 2019.

Band member Sam Hales said "'Bad Dream' was the last song written for the record. We were having a party at my house [and] I hadn't show anyone the song and then I played it over the speakers and everyone was like, ‘That should be on the record!’ and then it was."

Certifications

References

2017 songs
2017 singles
The Jungle Giants songs